The Peloritani (Sicilian:) are a mountain range of north-eastern Sicily, in southern Italy, extending for some  from Capo Peloro to the Nebrodi Mountains. On the north and east they are bordered by the Tyrrhenian and Ionian Seas respectively, and on the south by the Alcantara River .

The highest peaks are the Montagna Grande, the Rocca di Novara, the Pizzo di Vernà, the Monte Poverello and the Monte Scuderi. The deep gorges house numerous streams that create the typical rivers of this land called , often full of deprises in their inferior flow. The most common rocks are of igneous and metamorphic origin. Sandstone soils are also present. Of unusual origin are the megaliths rocks of the Argimusco plateau.

Vegetation includes holm oak, oak, cork oak, beech, pine and chestnut, which once formed large forests but are now, mostly due to human presence, reduced to sparse woods so that the landscape is largely steppe-like. Several pine woods have been reconstituted by the local authorities since the 1950s.
An ancient path, runs along the  ridge line from Monte Dinnammare above the Strait of Messina to the Rocca di Novara.

References

Mountain ranges of Italy
Mountains of Sicily
Mountain ranges of Sicily